

Bro (continued)

Broo

|- class="vcard"
| class="fn org" | Brook (New Forest)
| class="adr" | Hampshire
| class="note" | 
| class="note" | 
|- class="vcard"
| class="fn org" | Brook (Test Valley)
| class="adr" | Hampshire
| class="note" | 
| class="note" | 
|- class="vcard"
| class="fn org" | Brook
| class="adr" | Kent
| class="note" | 
| class="note" | 
|- class="vcard"
| class="fn org" | Brook (Albury)
| class="adr" | Surrey
| class="note" | 
| class="note" | 
|- class="vcard"
| class="fn org" | Brook (Witley)
| class="adr" | Surrey
| class="note" | 
| class="note" | 
|- class="vcard"
| class="fn org" | Brook
| class="adr" | Isle of Wight
| class="note" | 
| class="note" | 
|- class="vcard"
| class="fn org" | Brook (Dunsford)
| class="adr" | Devon
| class="note" | 
| class="note" | 
|- class="vcard"
| class="fn org" | Brook (Tavistock)
| class="adr" | Devon
| class="note" | 
| class="note" | 
|- class="vcard"
| class="fn org" | Brook
| class="adr" | Carmarthenshire
| class="note" | 
| class="note" | 
|- class="vcard"
| class="fn org" | Brook Bottom
| class="adr" | Lancashire
| class="note" | 
| class="note" | 
|- class="vcard"
| class="fn org" | Brook Bottom
| class="adr" | Tameside
| class="note" | 
| class="note" | 
|- class="vcard"
| class="fn org" | Brook Bottom
| class="adr" | Cheshire
| class="note" | 
| class="note" | 
|- class="vcard"
| class="fn org" | Brooke
| class="adr" | Norfolk
| class="note" | 
| class="note" | 
|- class="vcard"
| class="fn org" | Brooke
| class="adr" | Rutland
| class="note" | 
| class="note" | 
|- class="vcard"
| class="fn org" | Brookenby
| class="adr" | Lincolnshire
| class="note" | 
| class="note" | 
|- class="vcard"
| class="fn org" | Brook End (Borough of Bedford)
| class="adr" | Bedfordshire
| class="note" | 
| class="note" | 
|- class="vcard"
| class="fn org" | Brook End (Central Bedfordshire)
| class="adr" | Bedfordshire
| class="note" | 
| class="note" | 
|- class="vcard"
| class="fn org" | Brook End
| class="adr" | Cambridgeshire
| class="note" | 
| class="note" | 
|- class="vcard"
| class="fn org" | Brookend (Hinton)
| class="adr" | Gloucestershire
| class="note" | 
| class="note" | 
|- class="vcard"
| class="fn org" | Brookend (Woolaston)
| class="adr" | Gloucestershire
| class="note" | 
| class="note" | 
|- class="vcard"
| class="fn org" | Brook End
| class="adr" | Hertfordshire
| class="note" | 
| class="note" | 
|- class="vcard"
| class="fn org" | Brook End
| class="adr" | Milton Keynes
| class="note" | 
| class="note" | 
|- class="vcard"
| class="fn org" | Brook End
| class="adr" | Oxfordshire
| class="note" | 
| class="note" | 
|- class="vcard"
| class="fn org" | Brook End
| class="adr" | Wiltshire
| class="note" | 
| class="note" | 
|- class="vcard"
| class="fn org" | Brook End
| class="adr" | Worcestershire
| class="note" | 
| class="note" | 
|- class="vcard"
| class="fn org" | Brookfield
| class="adr" | Middlesbrough
| class="note" | 
| class="note" | 
|- class="vcard"
| class="fn org" | Brookfield
| class="adr" | Lancashire
| class="note" | 
| class="note" | 
|- class="vcard"
| class="fn org" | Brookfield
| class="adr" | Derbyshire
| class="note" | 
| class="note" | 
|- class="vcard"
| class="fn org" | Brookfield
| class="adr" | Renfrewshire
| class="note" | 
| class="note" | 
|- class="vcard"
| class="fn org" | Brookfoot
| class="adr" | Calderdale
| class="note" | 
| class="note" | 
|- class="vcard"
| class="fn org" | Brookgreen
| class="adr" | Isle of Wight
| class="note" | 
| class="note" | 
|- class="vcard"
| class="fn org" | Brook Green
| class="adr" | Suffolk
| class="note" | 
| class="note" | 
|- class="vcard"
| class="fn org" | Brook Green
| class="adr" | Hammersmith and Fulham
| class="note" | 
| class="note" | 
|- class="vcard"
| class="fn org" | Brookhampton
| class="adr" | Somerset
| class="note" | 
| class="note" | 
|- class="vcard"
| class="fn org" | Brookhampton
| class="adr" | Shropshire
| class="note" | 
| class="note" | 
|- class="vcard"
| class="fn org" | Brookhampton
| class="adr" | Oxfordshire
| class="note" | 
| class="note" | 
|- class="vcard"
| class="fn org" | Brook Hill
| class="adr" | Hampshire
| class="note" | 
| class="note" | 
|- class="vcard"
| class="fn org" | Brook Hill
| class="adr" | Nottinghamshire
| class="note" | 
| class="note" | 
|- class="vcard"
| class="fn org" | Brookhouse (Blackburn)
| class="adr" | Lancashire
| class="note" | 
| class="note" | 
|- class="vcard"
| class="fn org" | Brookhouse (Caton-with-Littledale)
| class="adr" | Lancashire
| class="note" | 
| class="note" | 
|- class="vcard"
| class="fn org" | Brookhouse
| class="adr" | Calderdale
| class="note" | 
| class="note" | 
|- class="vcard"
| class="fn org" | Brookhouse
| class="adr" | Rotherham
| class="note" | 
| class="note" | 
|- class="vcard"
| class="fn org" | Brookhouse
| class="adr" | Denbighshire
| class="note" | 
| class="note" | 
|- class="vcard"
| class="fn org" | Brookhouse
| class="adr" | Cheshire
| class="note" | 
| class="note" | 
|- class="vcard"
| class="fn org" | Brookhouse Green
| class="adr" | Cheshire
| class="note" | 
| class="note" | 
|- class="vcard"
| class="fn org" | Brookhouses
| class="adr" | Derbyshire
| class="note" | 
| class="note" | 
|- class="vcard"
| class="fn org" | Brookhouses
| class="adr" | Staffordshire
| class="note" | 
| class="note" | 
|- class="vcard"
| class="fn org" | Brookhurst
| class="adr" | Wirral
| class="note" | 
| class="note" | 
|- class="vcard"
| class="fn org" | Brookland
| class="adr" | Kent
| class="note" | 
| class="note" | 
|- class="vcard"
| class="fn org" | Brooklands
| class="adr" | Surrey
| class="note" | 
| class="note" | 
|- class="vcard"
| class="fn org" | Brooklands
| class="adr" | Leeds
| class="note" | 
| class="note" | 
|- class="vcard"
| class="fn org" | Brooklands
| class="adr" | Trafford
| class="note" | 
| class="note" | 
|- class="vcard"
| class="fn org" | Brooklands
| class="adr" | Shropshire
| class="note" | 
| class="note" | 
|- class="vcard"
| class="fn org" | Brookleigh
| class="adr" | Devon
| class="note" | 
| class="note" | 
|- class="vcard"
| class="fn org" | Brookmans Park
| class="adr" | Hertfordshire
| class="note" | 
| class="note" | 
|- class="vcard"
| class="fn org" | Brookpits
| class="adr" | West Sussex
| class="note" | 
| class="note" | 
|- class="vcard"
| class="fn org" | Brook Place
| class="adr" | Surrey
| class="note" | 
| class="note" | 
|- class="vcard"
| class="fn org" | Brookrow
| class="adr" | Shropshire
| class="note" | 
| class="note" | 
|- class="vcard"
| class="fn org" | Brooks
| class="adr" | Cornwall
| class="note" | 
| class="note" | 
|- class="vcard"
| class="fn org" | Brooks
| class="adr" | Powys
| class="note" | 
| class="note" | 
|- class="vcard"
| class="fn org" | Brooksbottoms
| class="adr" | Bury
| class="note" | 
| class="note" | 
|- class="vcard"
| class="fn org" | Brooksby
| class="adr" | Leicestershire
| class="note" | 
| class="note" | 
|- class="vcard"
| class="fn org" | Brooks End
| class="adr" | Kent
| class="note" | 
| class="note" | 
|- class="vcard"
| class="fn org" | Brooks Green
| class="adr" | West Sussex
| class="note" | 
| class="note" | 
|- class="vcard"
| class="fn org" | Brookside
| class="adr" | Berkshire
| class="note" | 
| class="note" | 
|- class="vcard"
| class="fn org" | Brookside
| class="adr" | Derbyshire
| class="note" | 
| class="note" | 
|- class="vcard"
| class="fn org" | Brookside
| class="adr" | Shropshire
| class="note" | 
| class="note" | 
|- class="vcard"
| class="fn org" | Brook Street
| class="adr" | West Sussex
| class="note" | 
| class="note" | 
|- class="vcard"
| class="fn org" | Brook Street (Tonbridge)
| class="adr" | Kent
| class="note" | 
| class="note" | 
|- class="vcard"
| class="fn org" | Brook Street (Woodchurch)
| class="adr" | Kent
| class="note" | 
| class="note" | 
|- class="vcard"
| class="fn org" | Brook Street
| class="adr" | Suffolk
| class="note" | 
| class="note" | 
|- class="vcard"
| class="fn org" | Brook Street
| class="adr" | Essex
| class="note" | 
| class="note" | 
|- class="vcard"
| class="fn org" | Brookthorpe
| class="adr" | Gloucestershire
| class="note" | 
| class="note" | 
|- class="vcard"
| class="fn org" | Brookvale
| class="adr" | Cheshire
| class="note" | 
| class="note" | 
|- class="vcard"
| class="fn org" | Brookville
| class="adr" | Norfolk
| class="note" | 
| class="note" | 
|- class="vcard"
| class="fn org" | Brook Waters
| class="adr" | Wiltshire
| class="note" | 
| class="note" | 
|- class="vcard"
| class="fn org" | Brookwood
| class="adr" | Surrey
| class="note" | 
| class="note" | 
|- class="vcard"
| class="fn org" | Broom
| class="adr" | Devon
| class="note" | 
| class="note" | 
|- class="vcard"
| class="fn org" | Broom
| class="adr" | Bedfordshire
| class="note" | 
| class="note" | 
|- class="vcard"
| class="fn org" | Broom
| class="adr" | Warwickshire
| class="note" | 
| class="note" | 
|- class="vcard"
| class="fn org" | Broom
| class="adr" | Pembrokeshire
| class="note" | 
| class="note" | 
|- class="vcard"
| class="fn org" | Broom
| class="adr" | Cumbria
| class="note" | 
| class="note" | 
|- class="vcard"
| class="fn org" | Broom
| class="adr" | Rotherham
| class="note" | 
| class="note" | 
|- class="vcard"
| class="fn org" | Broom
| class="adr" | East Renfrewshire
| class="note" | 
| class="note" | 
|- class="vcard"
| class="fn org" | Broom
| class="adr" | Fife
| class="note" | 
| class="note" | 
|- class="vcard"
| class="fn org" | Broombank
| class="adr" | Worcestershire
| class="note" | 
| class="note" | 
|- class="vcard"
| class="fn org" | Broome
| class="adr" | Norfolk
| class="note" | 
| class="note" | 
|- class="vcard"
| class="fn org" | Broome (Cardington)
| class="adr" | Shropshire
| class="note" | 
| class="note" | 
|- class="vcard"
| class="fn org" | Broome (Hopesay)
| class="adr" | Shropshire
| class="note" | 
| class="note" | 
|- class="vcard"
| class="fn org" | Broome
| class="adr" | Worcestershire
| class="note" | 
| class="note" | 
|- class="vcard"
| class="fn org" | Broomedge
| class="adr" | Cheshire
| class="note" | 
| class="note" | 
|- class="vcard"
| class="fn org" | Broomer's Corner
| class="adr" | West Sussex
| class="note" | 
| class="note" | 
|- class="vcard"
| class="fn org" | Broomershill
| class="adr" | West Sussex
| class="note" | 
| class="note" | 
|- class="vcard"
| class="fn org" | Broomfield
| class="adr" | Somerset
| class="note" | 
| class="note" | 
|- class="vcard"
| class="fn org" | Broomfield
| class="adr" | Essex
| class="note" | 
| class="note" | 
|- class="vcard"
| class="fn org" | Broomfield (Herne Bay)
| class="adr" | Kent
| class="note" | 
| class="note" | 
|- class="vcard"
| class="fn org" | Broomfield (Maidstone)
| class="adr" | Kent
| class="note" | 
| class="note" | 
|- class="vcard"
| class="fn org" | Broomfield
| class="adr" | Wiltshire
| class="note" | 
| class="note" | 
|- class="vcard"
| class="fn org" | Broomfield
| class="adr" | Cumbria
| class="note" | 
| class="note" | 
|- class="vcard"
| class="fn org" | Broomfield
| class="adr" | Aberdeenshire
| class="note" | 
| class="note" | 
|- class="vcard"
| class="fn org" | Broomfields
| class="adr" | Shropshire
| class="note" | 
| class="note" | 
|- class="vcard"
| class="fn org" | Broomfleet
| class="adr" | East Riding of Yorkshire
| class="note" | 
| class="note" | 
|- class="vcard"
| class="fn org" | Broom Green
| class="adr" | Norfolk
| class="note" | 
| class="note" | 
|- class="vcard"
| class="fn org" | Broomhall
| class="adr" | Surrey
| class="note" | 
| class="note" | 
|- class="vcard"
| class="fn org" | Broomhall
| class="adr" | Cheshire
| class="note" | 
| class="note" | 
|- class="vcard"
| class="fn org" | Broomhall Green
| class="adr" | Cheshire
| class="note" | 
| class="note" | 
|- class="vcard"
| class="fn org" | Broomham
| class="adr" | East Sussex
| class="note" | 
| class="note" | 
|- class="vcard"
| class="fn org" | Broomhaugh
| class="adr" | Northumberland
| class="note" | 
| class="note" | 
|- class="vcard"
| class="fn org" | Broomhill
| class="adr" | Barnsley
| class="note" | 
| class="note" | 
|- class="vcard"
| class="fn org" | Broom Hill
| class="adr" | City of Bristol
| class="note" | 
| class="note" | 
|- class="vcard"
| class="fn org" | Broomhill
| class="adr" | City of Bristol
| class="note" | 
| class="note" | 
|- class="vcard"
| class="fn org" | Broom Hill
| class="adr" | Bromley
| class="note" | 
| class="note" | 
|- class="vcard"
| class="fn org" | Broomhill
| class="adr" | Cheshire
| class="note" | 
| class="note" | 
|- class="vcard"
| class="fn org" | Broom Hill
| class="adr" | Dorset
| class="note" | 
| class="note" | 
|- class="vcard"
| class="fn org" | Broom Hill
| class="adr" | Durham
| class="note" | 
| class="note" | 
|- class="vcard"
| class="fn org" | Broomhill
| class="adr" | Highland
| class="note" | 
| class="note" | 
|- class="vcard"
| class="fn org" | Broomhill
| class="adr" | Kent
| class="note" | 
| class="note" | 
|- class="vcard"
| class="fn org" | Broomhill
| class="adr" | Norfolk
| class="note" | 
| class="note" | 
|- class="vcard"
| class="fn org" | Broomhill
| class="adr" | Northumberland
| class="note" | 
| class="note" | 
|- class="vcard"
| class="fn org" | Broomhill
| class="adr" | Nottinghamshire
| class="note" | 
| class="note" | 
|- class="vcard"
| class="fn org" | Broomhill
| class="adr" | Scottish Borders
| class="note" | 
| class="note" | 
|- class="vcard"
| class="fn org" | Broom Hill
| class="adr" | Suffolk
| class="note" | 
| class="note" | 
|- class="vcard"
| class="fn org" | Broom Hill
| class="adr" | Worcestershire
| class="note" | 
| class="note" | 
|- class="vcard"
| class="fn org" | Broomhill Bank
| class="adr" | Kent
| class="note" | 
| class="note" | 
|- class="vcard"
| class="fn org" | Broomholm
| class="adr" | Norfolk
| class="note" | 
| class="note" | 
|- class="vcard"
| class="fn org" | Broomhouse
| class="adr" | City of Glasgow
| class="note" | 
| class="note" | 
|- class="vcard"
| class="fn org" | Broomlands
| class="adr" | North Ayrshire
| class="note" | 
| class="note" | 
|- class="vcard"
| class="fn org" | Broomley
| class="adr" | Northumberland
| class="note" | 
| class="note" | 
|- class="vcard"
| class="fn org" | Broompark
| class="adr" | Durham
| class="note" | 
| class="note" | 
|- class="vcard"
| class="fn org" | Broomridge
| class="adr" | Stirling
| class="note" | 
| class="note" | 
|- class="vcard"
| class="fn org" | Broom's Barn
| class="adr" | Suffolk
| class="note" | 
| class="note" | 
|- class="vcard"
| class="fn org" | Broom's Green
| class="adr" | Herefordshire
| class="note" | 
| class="note" | 
|- class="vcard"
| class="fn org" | Broomsgrove
| class="adr" | East Sussex
| class="note" | 
| class="note" | 
|- class="vcard"
| class="fn org" | Broomsthorpe
| class="adr" | Norfolk
| class="note" | 
| class="note" | 
|- class="vcard"
| class="fn org" | Broom Street
| class="adr" | Kent
| class="note" | 
| class="note" | 
|- class="vcard"
| class="fn org" | Broomy Hill
| class="adr" | Herefordshire
| class="note" | 
| class="note" | 
|- class="vcard"
| class="fn org" | Broomyshaw
| class="adr" | Staffordshire
| class="note" | 
| class="note" | 
|}

Bror-Brou

|- class="vcard"
| class="fn org" | Brora
| class="adr" | Highland
| class="note" | 
| class="note" | 
|- class="vcard"
| class="fn org" | Brosdale Island
| class="adr" | Argyll and Bute
| class="note" | 
| class="note" | 
|- class="vcard"
| class="fn org" | Broseley
| class="adr" | Shropshire
| class="note" | 
| class="note" | 
|- class="vcard"
| class="fn org" | Brotherhouse Bar
| class="adr" | Lincolnshire
| class="note" | 
| class="note" | 
|- class="vcard"
| class="fn org" | Brotheridge Green
| class="adr" | Worcestershire
| class="note" | 
| class="note" | 
|- class="vcard"
| class="fn org" | Brother Isle
| class="adr" | Shetland Islands
| class="note" | 
| class="note" | 
|- class="vcard"
| class="fn org" | Brotherlee
| class="adr" | Durham
| class="note" | 
| class="note" | 
|- class="vcard"
| class="fn org" | Brothertoft
| class="adr" | Lincolnshire
| class="note" | 
| class="note" | 
|- class="vcard"
| class="fn org" | Brotherton
| class="adr" | Wakefield
| class="note" | 
| class="note" | 
|- class="vcard"
| class="fn org" | Brothybeck
| class="adr" | Cumbria
| class="note" | 
| class="note" | 
|- class="vcard"
| class="fn org" | Brotton
| class="adr" | Redcar and Cleveland
| class="note" | 
| class="note" | 
|- class="vcard"
| class="fn org" | Broubster
| class="adr" | Highland
| class="note" | 
| class="note" | 
|- class="vcard"
| class="fn org" | Brough
| class="adr" | Cumbria
| class="note" | 
| class="note" | 
|- class="vcard"
| class="fn org" | Brough
| class="adr" | Derbyshire
| class="note" | 
| class="note" | 
|- class="vcard"
| class="fn org" | Brough
| class="adr" | East Riding of Yorkshire
| class="note" | 
| class="note" | 
|- class="vcard"
| class="fn org" | Brough
| class="adr" | Highland
| class="note" | 
| class="note" | 
|- class="vcard"
| class="fn org" | Brough
| class="adr" | Nottinghamshire
| class="note" | 
| class="note" | 
|- class="vcard"
| class="fn org" | Brough
| class="adr" | Orkney Islands
| class="note" | 
| class="note" | 
|- class="vcard"
| class="fn org" | Brough (Skellister)
| class="adr" | Shetland Islands
| class="note" | 
| class="note" | 
|- class="vcard"
| class="fn org" | Brough (Tofts Voe)
| class="adr" | Shetland Islands
| class="note" | 
| class="note" | 
|- class="vcard"
| class="fn org" | Brough (Whalsay)
| class="adr" | Shetland Islands
| class="note" | 
| class="note" | 
|- class="vcard"
| class="fn org" | Broughall
| class="adr" | Shropshire
| class="note" | 
| class="note" | 
|- class="vcard"
| class="fn org" | Brough Head
| class="adr" | Orkney Islands
| class="note" | 
| class="note" | 
|- class="vcard"
| class="fn org" | Brough Ness
| class="adr" | Orkney Islands
| class="note" | 
| class="note" | 
|- class="vcard"
| class="fn org" | Brough Sowerby
| class="adr" | Cumbria
| class="note" | 
| class="note" | 
|- class="vcard"
| class="fn org" | Broughton
| class="adr" | Buckinghamshire
| class="note" | 
| class="note" | 
|- class="vcard"
| class="fn org" | Broughton
| class="adr" | Cambridgeshire
| class="note" | 
| class="note" | 
|- class="vcard"
| class="fn org" | Broughton
| class="adr" | City of Edinburgh
| class="note" | 
| class="note" | 
|- class="vcard"
| class="fn org" | Broughton
| class="adr" | Flintshire
| class="note" | 
| class="note" | 
|- class="vcard"
| class="fn org" | Broughton
| class="adr" | Hampshire
| class="note" | 
| class="note" | 
|- class="vcard"
| class="fn org" | Broughton
| class="adr" | Lancashire
| class="note" | 
| class="note" | 
|- class="vcard"
| class="fn org" | Broughton
| class="adr" | Northamptonshire
| class="note" | 
| class="note" | 
|- class="vcard"
| class="fn org" | Broughton
| class="adr" | North Lincolnshire
| class="note" | 
| class="note" | 
|- class="vcard"
| class="fn org" | Broughton (Craven)
| class="adr" | North Yorkshire
| class="note" | 
| class="note" | 
|- class="vcard"
| class="fn org" | Broughton (Ryedale)
| class="adr" | North Yorkshire
| class="note" | 
| class="note" | 
|- class="vcard"
| class="fn org" | Broughton
| class="adr" | Orkney Islands
| class="note" | 
| class="note" | 
|- class="vcard"
| class="fn org" | Broughton
| class="adr" | Oxfordshire
| class="note" | 
| class="note" | 
|- class="vcard"
| class="fn org" | Broughton
| class="adr" | Scottish Borders
| class="note" | 
| class="note" | 
|- class="vcard"
| class="fn org" | Broughton
| class="adr" | Shropshire
| class="note" | 
| class="note" | 
|- class="vcard"
| class="fn org" | Broughton
| class="adr" | Staffordshire
| class="note" | 
| class="note" | 
|- class="vcard"
| class="fn org" | Broughton
| class="adr" | The Vale Of Glamorgan
| class="note" | 
| class="note" | 
|- class="vcard"
| class="fn org" | Broughton Astley
| class="adr" | Leicestershire
| class="note" | 
| class="note" | 
|- class="vcard"
| class="fn org" | Broughton Beck
| class="adr" | Cumbria
| class="note" | 
| class="note" | 
|- class="vcard"
| class="fn org" | Broughton Common
| class="adr" | North Lincolnshire
| class="note" | 
| class="note" | 
|- class="vcard"
| class="fn org" | Broughton Cross
| class="adr" | Cumbria
| class="note" | 
| class="note" | 
|- class="vcard"
| class="fn org" | Broughton Gifford
| class="adr" | Wiltshire
| class="note" | 
| class="note" | 
|- class="vcard"
| class="fn org" | Broughton Green
| class="adr" | Worcestershire
| class="note" | 
| class="note" | 
|- class="vcard"
| class="fn org" | Broughton Hackett
| class="adr" | Worcestershire
| class="note" | 
| class="note" | 
|- class="vcard"
| class="fn org" | Broughton in Furness
| class="adr" | Cumbria
| class="note" | 
| class="note" | 
|- class="vcard"
| class="fn org" | Broughton Lodges
| class="adr" | Leicestershire
| class="note" | 
| class="note" | 
|- class="vcard"
| class="fn org" | Broughton Mills
| class="adr" | Cumbria
| class="note" | 
| class="note" | 
|- class="vcard"
| class="fn org" | Broughton Moor
| class="adr" | Cumbria
| class="note" | 
| class="note" | 
|- class="vcard"
| class="fn org" | Broughton Park
| class="adr" | Salford
| class="note" | 
| class="note" | 
|- class="vcard"
| class="fn org" | Broughton Poggs
| class="adr" | Oxfordshire
| class="note" | 
| class="note" | 
|- class="vcard"
| class="fn org" | Broughtown
| class="adr" | Orkney Islands
| class="note" | 
| class="note" | 
|- class="vcard"
| class="fn org" | Broughty Ferry
| class="adr" | City of Dundee
| class="note" | 
| class="note" | 
|}

Brow-Broy

|- class="vcard"
| class="fn org" | Brow Edge
| class="adr" | Cumbria
| class="note" | 
| class="note" | 
|- class="vcard"
| class="fn org" | Browhouses
| class="adr" | Dumfries and Galloway
| class="note" | 
| class="note" | 
|- class="vcard"
| class="fn org" | Browland
| class="adr" | Shetland Islands
| class="note" | 
| class="note" | 
|- class="vcard"
| class="fn org" | Brown Bank
| class="adr" | North Yorkshire
| class="note" | 
| class="note" | 
|- class="vcard"
| class="fn org" | Brownber
| class="adr" | Cumbria
| class="note" | 
| class="note" | 
|- class="vcard"
| class="fn org" | Brownbread Street
| class="adr" | East Sussex
| class="note" | 
| class="note" | 
|- class="vcard"
| class="fn org" | Brown Candover
| class="adr" | Hampshire
| class="note" | 
| class="note" | 
|- class="vcard"
| class="fn org" | Brown Edge
| class="adr" | Lancashire
| class="note" | 
| class="note" | 
|- class="vcard"
| class="fn org" | Brown Edge
| class="adr" | St Helens
| class="note" | 
| class="note" | 
|- class="vcard"
| class="fn org" | Brownedge
| class="adr" | Cheshire
| class="note" | 
| class="note" | 
|- class="vcard"
| class="fn org" | Brown Edge
| class="adr" | Staffordshire
| class="note" | 
| class="note" | 
|- class="vcard"
| class="fn org" | Browney
| class="adr" | Durham
| class="note" | 
| class="note" | 
|- class="vcard"
| class="fn org" | Brown Head
| class="adr" | North Ayrshire
| class="note" | 
| class="note" | 
|- class="vcard"
| class="fn org" | Brown Heath
| class="adr" | Cheshire
| class="note" | 
| class="note" | 
|- class="vcard"
| class="fn org" | Brown Heath
| class="adr" | Hampshire
| class="note" | 
| class="note" | 
|- class="vcard"
| class="fn org" | Brownheath
| class="adr" | Devon
| class="note" | 
| class="note" | 
|- class="vcard"
| class="fn org" | Brownheath
| class="adr" | Shropshire
| class="note" | 
| class="note" | 
|- class="vcard"
| class="fn org" | Brownheath Common
| class="adr" | Worcestershire
| class="note" | 
| class="note" | 
|- class="vcard"
| class="fn org" | Brownhill
| class="adr" | Aberdeenshire
| class="note" | 
| class="note" | 
|- class="vcard"
| class="fn org" | Brownhill
| class="adr" | Lancashire
| class="note" | 
| class="note" | 
|- class="vcard"
| class="fn org" | Brownhill
| class="adr" | Shropshire
| class="note" | 
| class="note" | 
|- class="vcard"
| class="fn org" | Brownhills
| class="adr" | Walsall
| class="note" | 
| class="note" | 
|- class="vcard"
| class="fn org" | Brownhills
| class="adr" | Shropshire
| class="note" | 
| class="note" | 
|- class="vcard"
| class="fn org" | Brownhills
| class="adr" | Fife
| class="note" | 
| class="note" | 
|- class="vcard"
| class="fn org" | Browninghill Green
| class="adr" | Hampshire
| class="note" | 
| class="note" | 
|- class="vcard"
| class="fn org" | Brown Knowl
| class="adr" | Cheshire
| class="note" | 
| class="note" | 
|- class="vcard"
| class="fn org" | Brown Lees
| class="adr" | Staffordshire
| class="note" | 
| class="note" | 
|- class="vcard"
| class="fn org" | Brownlow
| class="adr" | St Helens
| class="note" | 
| class="note" | 
|- class="vcard"
| class="fn org" | Brownlow
| class="adr" | Cheshire
| class="note" | 
| class="note" | 
|- class="vcard"
| class="fn org" | Brownlow Fold
| class="adr" | Bolton
| class="note" | 
| class="note" | 
|- class="vcard"
| class="fn org" | Brownlow Heath
| class="adr" | Cheshire
| class="note" | 
| class="note" | 
|- class="vcard"
| class="fn org" | Brown Moor
| class="adr" | Leeds
| class="note" | 
| class="note" | 
|- class="vcard"
| class="fn org" | Brown's Bank
| class="adr" | Cheshire
| class="note" | 
| class="note" | 
|- class="vcard"
| class="fn org" | Brownsea Island
| class="adr" | Dorset
| class="note" | 
| class="note" | 
|- class="vcard"
| class="fn org" | Brown's End
| class="adr" | Gloucestershire
| class="note" | 
| class="note" | 
|- class="vcard"
| class="fn org" | Brown's Green
| class="adr" | Birmingham
| class="note" | 
| class="note" | 
|- class="vcard"
| class="fn org" | Brownshill
| class="adr" | Gloucestershire
| class="note" | 
| class="note" | 
|- class="vcard"
| class="fn org" | Brownshill Green
| class="adr" | Coventry
| class="note" | 
| class="note" | 
|- class="vcard"
| class="fn org" | Brownside
| class="adr" | Lancashire
| class="note" | 
| class="note" | 
|- class="vcard"
| class="fn org" | Brownsover
| class="adr" | Warwickshire
| class="note" | 
| class="note" | 
|- class="vcard"
| class="fn org" | Brownston
| class="adr" | Devon
| class="note" | 
| class="note" | 
|- class="vcard"
| class="fn org" | Brown Street
| class="adr" | Suffolk
| class="note" | 
| class="note" | 
|- class="vcard"
| class="fn org" | Browns Wood
| class="adr" | Milton Keynes
| class="note" | 
| class="note" | 
|- class="vcard"
| class="fn org" | Browston Green
| class="adr" | Norfolk
| class="note" | 
| class="note" | 
|- class="vcard"
| class="fn org" | Browtop
| class="adr" | Cumbria
| class="note" | 
| class="note" | 
|- class="vcard"
| class="fn org" | Broxa
| class="adr" | North Yorkshire
| class="note" | 
| class="note" | 
|- class="vcard"
| class="fn org" | Broxbourne
| class="adr" | Hertfordshire
| class="note" | 
| class="note" | 
|- class="vcard"
| class="fn org" | Broxburn
| class="adr" | East Lothian
| class="note" | 
| class="note" | 
|- class="vcard"
| class="fn org" | Broxburn
| class="adr" | West Lothian
| class="note" | 
| class="note" | 
|- class="vcard"
| class="fn org" | Broxfield
| class="adr" | Northumberland
| class="note" | 
| class="note" | 
|- class="vcard"
| class="fn org" | Broxholme
| class="adr" | Lincolnshire
| class="note" | 
| class="note" | 
|- class="vcard"
| class="fn org" | Broxted
| class="adr" | Essex
| class="note" | 
| class="note" | 
|- class="vcard"
| class="fn org" | Broxton
| class="adr" | Cheshire
| class="note" | 
| class="note" | 
|- class="vcard"
| class="fn org" | Broxtowe
| class="adr" | Nottinghamshire
| class="note" | 
| class="note" | 
|- class="vcard"
| class="fn org" | Broxwood
| class="adr" | Herefordshire
| class="note" | 
| class="note" | 
|- class="vcard"
| class="fn org" | Broyle Side
| class="adr" | East Sussex
| class="note" | 
| class="note" | 
|}